James Lee Hansen (born June 13, 1925) is an American sculptor.

Early life
Hansen was born in Tacoma, Washington on June 13, 1925.

Works
 Talos (1964), Fulton Mall
 The Guardian (1965)
 Glyph Singer No. 3 (1976), Vancouver, Washington
 Winter Rider No. 2, Portland, Oregon

References

External links
 

1925 births
Living people
American sculptors
People from Tacoma, Washington